John Friel (1 August 1889 –  1 October 1963) was an Irish Fianna Fáil politician and merchant. He was elected to Dáil Éireann as a Fianna Fáil Teachta Dála (TD) for the Donegal East constituency at the 1937 general election. He was re-elected at each subsequent election until he lost his seat at the 1951 general election.

References

1889 births
1963 deaths
Fianna Fáil TDs
Members of the 9th Dáil
Members of the 10th Dáil
Members of the 11th Dáil
Members of the 12th Dáil
Members of the 13th Dáil
Politicians from County Donegal